The 2018 Porsche Carrera Cup Deutschland season was the 33rd German Porsche Carrera Cup season. It began on 14 April at Oschersleben and finished on 23 September at Hockenheimring after six double-header meetings, It is a support championship for the ADAC GT Masters.

Teams and drivers

Race calendar and results

References

External links
 
 Porsche Carrera Cup Germany Online Magazine

Porsche Carrera Cup Germany seasons
Porsche Carrera Cup Germany